The YD engine is a  Inline-4 diesel engine from Nissan. It has a cast-iron block and aluminium head with chain driven DOHC. The engine shares much of its architecture with the QR petrol engine.

YD22

YD22DD
Winner of the FY 1998 Sho-Ene Taisho (The Energy Conservation Prize), this engine was marketed as the NEO Di. The YD22DD is used in the Y11 Nissan AD Van and the Nissan Expert (VEW11). It is a naturally aspirated engine, utilising the VP44 electronic controlled rotary injection pump.

YD22DDT (VP44 pump)
The YD22DDT is used in the X-Trail, N16 Almera. It features the VP44 electronic rotary injection system and wastegated turbochargers. The VP44 pump models are easily spotted due to a flat acoustic cover over the engine.

YD22DDTi (common rail)

The YD22DDTi was a common rail diesel introduced in 2001, during the first small facelift of the P12 Primera, N16 Almera and V10 Almera Tino. It is also fitted to the Nissan X-trail. The injection system is common rail with a variable vane turbocharger is intercooled and produces the most power and torque of all the YD22 engines. Cars with this common rail engine usually carry the DDTI badge. The common rail version is easily distinguished from the VP44 model by the four injector bumps on the top of the acoustic cover.

Non intercooled versions of this engine were also available with a lower power rating.

YD25

YD25DDTi (VP44 Pump)

This engine features the VP44 rotary injection pump and is turbocharged and intercooled. In the Presage/Bassara it is fitted sideways with a variable vane turbocharger (Garrett GT1749V) and torque is limited to approximately  accommodate the 4 speed automatic gearbox attached.

In the D22 Navara/Kingcab/Frontier the engine is essentially the same other than modifications to accessories, mounts and plumbing to accommodate the longitudinal engine layout. The turbo is a wastegated IHI RHF4 which is also intercooled. The stronger gearbox allows it to produce more torque than the Presage/Bassara version.

Applications
 1998–2001 Nissan Presage
 1998–2001 Nissan Bassara
 Nissan D22 pickup (Navara / Kingcab / Frontier)
 Nissan D40 pickup (Navara)
 2004–present Nissan Frontier

YD25DDTi High Power (common rail "DCi")

The model description YD25DDTi technically refers to the YD25 engines which use the VP44 rotary electronic injection pump and run injection lines to each cylinder. It is equipped with a variable nozzle turbocharger (Garrett gt2056v).
This DDTi engine was last used in the Presage/Bassara and the D22 Navara.

The common rail versions of this engine are referred to in Europe as DCi. The common rail engines are used in the D40 navara, late model D22 Navara and the R51 Pathfinder. This is the engine referred to below.

YD25DDTi High Power was developed in 2005 for the Nissan Navara (D40) and the Nissan Pathfinder (R51). In 2011 the Nissan Murano was fitted with the updated engine.

Applications
 2006–2014 Nissan Navara (D40)
 2005–2012 Nissan Pathfinder (R51)
 2011–2014 Nissan Murano
 2013–present Nissan NV350 Caravan/Urvan E26
2015–present Nissan NP300 Navara (D23)
 2018–present Nissan Terra (D23)

Engine reference
The YD engine is manufactured in the following versions:

See also
 Nissan engines

References 

YD
Diesel engines by model
Straight-four engines